Larry Donnie Gladney (born 1957) is an American experimental particle physicist and cosmologist.  In 2019, he became Professor of Physics and the Phyllis A. Wallace Dean of Diversity and Faculty Development at Yale University.  Previously he was the Edmund J.  and Louise W. Kahn Professor for Faculty Excellence, and Associate Dean for Natural Sciences, at the University of Pennsylvania. His research has focused on issues relating to the origins of expansion of the universe following the Big Bang, and on fundamental connections between matter, energy, space, and time.  The recipient of many fellowships and prizes, and a former visiting scholar at the Lawrence Berkeley National Laboratory, Gladney featured in a 2006 oral history conducted by HistoryMakers, a digital archive project preserved at the Library of Congress, which aims to document the contributions of African-Americans to U.S. history and American society.

Biography 
Larry Gladney was born in 1957 in Cleveland, Mississippi.  His mother, Annie Lee Gladney, raised him in East St. Louis, Illinois, where he attended primary and secondary school, graduating in 1975 from East St. Louis High School.  He earned a B.A. degree in Physics from Northwestern University in 1979, and a Ph.D. in Physics from Stanford University in 1985.  From 1985 to 1988, he held a post-doctoral fellowship at the University of Pennsylvania, where he then joined the faculty. He reached the rank of full Professor in 2005, and later became chair of the physics department. During his time at Penn, he served as a chair of the African-American Resource Center's faculty advisory board. At Penn he held a chaired professorship – the Edmund J.  and Louise W. Kahn Professor for Faculty Excellence – and was Associate Dean for Natural Sciences, while holding a secondary appointment as Professor of Education in the Higher Education division of Penn's Graduate School of Education.  During his time at Penn, he was also active in science education outreach in Philadelphia-area public and parochial schools.  In 2019, he assumed positions as Professor of Physics and the Phyllis A. Wallace Dean of Diversity and Faculty Development at Yale University. Yale created this dean of diversity position in 2015 after students demonstrated to protest what they described as the inhospitable climate for black students at the university.

Research and leadership in physics 
Larry Gladney specializes in astro-particle physics and cosmology and in experimental particle physics.  He has conducted extensive research on the weak interactions of heavy quarks and the nature of dark energy.  One of his earliest breakthroughs occurred in the Collider Detector at Fermilab (CDF), where in the mid-1980s he studied the weak interactions of bottom hadrons.  More recently, he has been involved in research with the Vera C. Rubin Observatory's Large Synoptic Survey Telescope (LSST), under construction in Chile, which aims to measure the expansion history of the universe.

Gladney has served on the National Science Foundation-Department of Energy High Energy Physics Advisory Panel (HEPAP), the Director's Review Board of the Lawrence Berkeley National Laboratory (LBNL), the Experimental Physics Advisory Committee for the Stanford Linear Accelerator Center (SLAC), and the Program Advisory Committee for the Laser Interferometer Gravitational-Wave Observatory (LIGO) at Caltech.

Fellowships and honors 
Larry Gladney has won many fellowships and prizes.  From 1989 to 1994, he was a Presidential Young Investigator of the National Science Foundation.  He won a Lilly Teaching Fellowship in 1990.  In 1997, he received the Edward A. Bouchet Award from the American Physical Society and the Martin Luther King, Jr. Lecturer Award from Wayne State University.  The Black Graduate Professional Students’ Association of the University of Pennsylvania awarded him the Outstanding Community Service Award for his efforts to mentor and encourage young scholars.

References 

Living people
1957 births
Northwestern University alumni
Stanford University alumni
Yale University faculty
University of Pennsylvania people
American cosmologists
People from Mississippi
People from Philadelphia
People from East St. Louis, Illinois
20th-century American physicists
Scientists from St. Louis
20th-century African-American scientists
21st-century African-American people